Standing Committee on Defence (SCOF) is usually a parliamentary committee of parliaments of nations following a parliamentary system of governance. It generally scrutinises the government's actions on defence-related matters.

List of Standing Committees on Defence 
 Standing Committee on Defence (Norway)
 Standing Committee on Defence (India)